is a Japanese illustrator from Osaka Prefecture who works on the art for adult visual novels. He has worked for several different visual novel companies, such as Front Wing, Jaleco, Circus, F&C, and Key.

Games illustrated
Crank In
Grisaia no Kajitsu
Hoshiuta
Hoshiuta: Starlight Serenade
Pia Carrot G.O. TOYBOX ~Summer Fair~
Sorauta
Tomoyo After: It's a Wonderful Life
Yukiuta

Novels illustrated
Canvas 2 ~Niji Iro no Sketch~
Hourglass of Summer
Sakura: Yuki Tsuki Hana

External links
Fumio's personal website 

Fumio
Living people
Year of birth missing (living people)